The Chief Negotiator for Turkish Accession to the European Union (Turkish: Avrupa Birliği Başmüzakerecisi) was the most senior official representing the Republic of Turkey during the country's accession negotiations to the European Union. The position was established on 17 January 2005 by Prime Minister Recep Tayyip Erdoğan. Following the establishment of the Ministry of European Union Affairs on 29 June 2011, the Minister of European Union Affairs was usually appointed concurrently to serve as the Chief Negotiator. The last Chief Negotiator was the EU Affairs Minister Ömer Çelik, in office between 2016–2018.

History
With formal accession talks between Turkey and the European Union beginning in the years 2004 and 2005, the role of Chief Negotiator was established to represent the Turkish delegation during the membership negotiations. Prime Minister Recep Tayyip Erdoğan appointed Ali Babacan as the first Chief Negotiator on 17 January 2005, while the then-Foreign Minister Abdullah Gül became the president of the Turkish delegation.

When the Ministry of European Union Affairs was established on 29 June 2011 before Erdoğan formed his third and final government, the Minister responsible for the new department began serving concurrently as the Chief Negotiator. The only event in which this was not the case occurred between 28 August and 22 September 2015, where Ali Haydar Konca was appointed as the Minister for European Union Affairs but was not, according to official records, appointed as the Chief Negotiator.

List of former Chief Negotiators

See also
Accession of Turkey to the European Union

References

External links
Ministry of European Union Affairs

Turkish governmental institutions